The Australian Labor Party is an Australian political party. It is organised into a national organisation as well as a branch in each state and territory, as follows:

 Australian Labor Party (New South Wales Branch)
 Australian Labor Party (Victorian Branch)
 Australian Labor Party (Queensland Branch)
 Australian Labor Party (Western Australian Branch)
 Australian Labor Party (South Australian Branch)
 Australian Labor Party (Tasmanian Branch)
 Australian Labor Party (Australian Capital Territory Branch)
 Australian Labor Party (Northern Territory Branch)

References